Giog is a multi-trick game played by two to four players. It is similar to the card games of Tam cúc, Chēmǎbāo and Zhìhǔ.

Equipment

Like Banqi, Giog uses Xiangqi pieces. For Giog, it is important that the backs as well as the rims of the pieces be indistinguishable from each other so the pieces cannot be identified when face down. There are seven piece types in the game: Pawns, Cannons, Horses (or Knights), Chariots (or Rooks), Advisors (or Elephants), Guards, Generals (or Kings). There are altogether 32 pieces and 2 colors such as Red and Black.

The ranking of pieces in Giog is identical to Banqi's ranking. That is, in ascending order: 

 Pawns < Cannons < Horses < Chariots < Advisors < Guards < Generals.

The exceptions are: firstly, a black piece is always inferior than a red piece of the type.

 Black < Red.

For example, Red Horse beats Black Horse.

Distribution
All players help to scramble the 32 pieces face down and distribute the pieces evenly to themselves. If the number of players is three, the winner of the previous game or a volunteer receives 12 pieces and the other two players receive 10 pieces each. Each player arranges their pieces into one line with half of the pieces on top of the other half.

Each of the players now reveals (turns up) any one lower piece not in their own line. They then place the revealed piece face up on top of the other face down piece. The ranking of the four revealed pieces determines the order of the players who revealed them. Should there be a tie among some players, they apply the same procedures again by revealing more lower pieces until the order is finally determined.

The first player (who revealed or subsequently revealed the strongest piece in the previous process) starts to choose their pieces. They may only choose their pieces starting from a left or right head duo in any player's profile. They therefore have as many choices as twice the number of players. Following the first player, the second, third and fourth players consecutively collect their pieces, two at one time. The process is repeated until no piece (4-player game), 2 pieces (3-player game), 8 pieces (2-player game) are remained. These pieces are kept face down at a side and do not enter the game.

Rules
The first player leads the first trick. They, or any player who starts a new trick or multi-trick, may play the following six valid combinations of a same color:

 "Liab": Single. Any piece.
 "Dui": Double. Any 2 identical pieces.
 "Giog": A triple of a certain combination:
 1 Chariot + 1 Horse + 1 Cannon
 1 Cannon + 1 Advisor + 1 Guard
 1 General + 1 Guard + 1 Advisor
 "Sam Mui": 3 identical pieces.
 "Si Mui": 4 identical pieces.
 "Wu Mui": 5 identical pieces.

Each of the other players must play the same number of pieces. A player may play any pieces regardless of color or rank if they do not have the above valid combinations. The ranking of "Liab" is as before. Bear in mind that Black < Red. The ranking of "Dui" is same as the ranking of "Liab". The ranking of "Giog" is as follows: 

Chariot, Horse, Cannon < Cannon, Advisor, Guard < General, Guard, Advisor.

The ranking of "Sam Mui", "Si Mui" and "Wu Mui" are according to color, since only pawns are possible to form them.

The player who played the strongest combinations of a same type (as what the trick-starter played) wins that trick. If there is a tie, the trick-starter always wins, or the order of players determines the winner. For example, if the first and fourth player play the same combinations, first player wins unless fourth player is the trick-starter. The winner of a trick collects the won pieces and starts a new trick. The hand continues until all pieces are exhausted. The winner is the player who wins the most pieces.

Beheading the cock
It is forbidden to play a General in the first or last trick, either as a single piece or as part of a valid or non-valid combination. If a player is forced or deceived into playing a general in the first or last trick, then it is said that a cock is beheaded, and that player is considered the ultimate loser of the hand even if they win the most pieces.

References

External links
Giog at BoardGameGeek
Giog at pagat.com

Chinese games
Trick-taking tile games